Willow Fork Township is a township in Moniteau County, in the U.S. state of Missouri.

Willow Fork Township was named for the stream of Willow Fork.

References

Townships in Missouri
Townships in Moniteau County, Missouri
Jefferson City metropolitan area